Boloria alaskensis, the mountain fritillary or Alaskan fritillary, is a species of fritillary butterfly in the family Nymphalidae. It was described by William Jacob Holland in 1900 and is found in North America and North European Russia. The MONA or Hodges number for Boloria alaskensis is 4462. The larvae feed on false bistort (Polygonum bistortoides) and alpine smartweed (P. viviparum).

It is very similar to Boloria pales.

Subspecies
 Boloria alaskensis alaskensis (W. Holland, 1900)
 Boloria alaskensis halli Klots, 1940

References

 Pelham, Jonathan P. (2008). "A catalogue of the butterflies of the United States and Canada with a complete bibliography of the descriptive and systematic literature". Journal of Research on the Lepidoptera, 40, xiv + 658.

Further reading

 Arnett, Ross H. (2000). American Insects: A Handbook of the Insects of America North of Mexico. CRC Press.

Boloria
Butterflies described in 1900